Aurel Boroș (born 11 November 1922, date of death unknown) was a Romanian football goalkeeper. He reached two Cupa României finals with Universitatea Cluj and Locomotiva Timișoara, but both of them were lost. Boroș is deceased.

International career
Aurel Boroș played two friendly matches for Romania's national team.

Honours
Universitatea Cluj
Cupa României runner-up: 1941–42
Locomotiva Timișoara
Cupa României runner-up: 1947–48

Notes

References

External links

Aurel Boroș at Labtof.ro

1922 births
Year of death missing
Association football goalkeepers
FC CFR Timișoara players
FC Universitatea Cluj players
Liga I players
Liga II players
Romanian footballers
Romania international footballers